The 2005 Italian Open (also known as the 2005 Rome Masters and the 2005 Telecom Italia Masters for sponsorship reason) was a tennis tournament played on outdoor clay courts. It was the 62nd edition of the Italian Open, and was part of the ATP Masters Series of the 2005 ATP Tour, and of the Tier I Series of the 2005 WTA Tour. Both the men's and the women's events took place at the Foro Italico in Rome, Italy.

Finals

Men's singles

 Rafael Nadal defeated  Guillermo Coria, 6–4, 3–6, 6–3, 4–6, 7–6(8–6)
It was Rafael Nadal's 5th title of the year, and his 6th overall. It was his 2nd Masters title of the year, and his 2nd overall.

Women's singles

 Amélie Mauresmo defeated  Patty Schnyder, 2–6, 6–3, 6–4
It was Amélie Mauresmo's 2nd title of the year, and her 17th overall. It was her 1st Tier I title of the year and her 6th overall.

Men's doubles

 Michaël Llodra /  Fabrice Santoro defeated  Bob Bryan  /  Mike Bryan, 6–4, 6–2

Women's doubles

 Cara Black /  Liezel Huber defeated  Maria Kirilenko /  Anabel Medina Garrigues, 6–0, 4–6, 6–1

References
general
 Men's Singles draw
 Men's Doubles draw
 Men's Qualifying Singles draw
 Women's Singles, Doubles and Qualifying Singles draws
specific

External links
Official website

Italian Open
Italian Open
 
Italian Open
Tennis
2005 Italian Open (Tennis)